Summit Christian Academy is a private, non-denominational Christian school for PreK-3 through 12th grade students. It is located in Cedar Park, TX and serves the Williamson County and Austin, Texas area. 

Summit Christian Academy offers a core curriculum as well as Spanish for elementary students and Dual Credit and Advanced Placement courses, to include AP Art, for secondary students. 

An Innovation Center established in 2020 fosters the habits of mind and critical thinking skills necessary to prepare students to be leaders. In conjunction, students are taught Technology Foundations and may take electives in Engineering and Computer Science. Paul Austin, Lego Mindstorm Developer and retired National Instruments Chief Architect instructs Computer Science courses. 

Impact is Summit Christian Academy’s program to prepare students to impact others for Christ, particularly through service. This begins at the elementary level with projects and exercises that spotlight God's love for all people, the importance of prayer, and the impact service can have on the world. At the secondary level, students explore what it means to live as Christians and engage in service in partnership with local community ministries as well as on short term missions trips.

Thirteen varsity athletic teams compete for Summit in the Texas Association of Private and Parochial Schools league. Varsity sports include 6-man football, girls volleyball, boys and girls cross country, boys and girls basketball, boys and girls track & field, boys and girls tennis, boys and girls golf and baseball. Intermediate and elementary sports beginning in 4th grade are also available. The school mascot is an eagle.

References

External links
 Summit Christian Academy web page

Christian schools in Texas
Cedar Park, Texas
Nondenominational Christian schools in the United States
Private K-12 schools in Texas
1998 establishments in Texas